Venice Fishing Pier is a pier in Venice, Los Angeles, in the U.S. state of California. The current concrete structure was completed . According to Paste, the pier extends approximately 1,300 feet into the Pacific Ocean.

In 2018 the Venice Oceanarium proposed a new exhibited space for the pier.

References

External links 

 
 Mission, Venice Pier Project

1960s establishments in California
Piers in California
Venice, Los Angeles